Gérard Oberlé (born 27 November 1945, Saverne) is a French writer and bibliographer.

Origin and biography 
Born in Alsace, of parents from Lorraine originating from Dabo where his grandfather was a clog maker, Gérard Oberlé spent there his summers.<ref>{{Cite web | url=http://www.franceculture.com/oeuvre-retour-a-zornhof-de-gerard-oberle.html-0 | title=Retour à Zornhof | author=France Culture | accessdate=15 December 2016 }} In this book, Gérard Oberlé evokes the memories of his childhood.</ref> An adolescent in Switzerland by the Jesuits at Fribourg, then a student in classical literature in Strasbourg and The Sorbonne, he became an auxiliary master of Latin and ancient Greek in Metz, but must quickly leave teaching.

 Ancient books 
In 1967–1968, he became a bookseller of used books, after reading a small advertisement. In 1971 he opened his own shop. He has lived since 1976 in a manor house of Nivernais where he has published various specialized catalogs on peddler literature, roman noir, literary cranks, or else neo-Latin poetry in Europe from the XVIth to the XIXe.

He is an expert at the Court of Appeal of Bourges, an expert approved by the National Company of Experts. He has reprinted the Légendes et chants de gestes canaques by Louise Michel, as well as various other forgotten works.

 Literature and bibliography 
In 1989, the Éditions Belfond published his Les Fastes de Bacchus et de Comus, a bibliographic catalog of an important collection of gastronomy books. In 1992, he wrote the catalog Kilian Fritsch, a book collector on wine and oenology, whose library was scattered during a sale organized by Guy Loudmer in 1993.

In 2000, he became a writer, his first novel was a detective one. He is also a chronicler at France Musique. in the américan magazine Men's Journal and Lire and since 2012 at Lire He has a correspondence with Jim Harrison which partly appeared in Raw and the Cooked: Adventures of a Roving Gourmand in 2001.

 Publications 
1972: De Horace Walpole… à Jean Ray : l’évolution du roman noir, gothique et frénétique, Manoir de Pron
1983: La Bibliothèque bleue : livres de colportage du XVIIe au XIXe siècle, Montigny-sur-Canne, Manoir de Pron
1985: Fous à lire, fous à lier : ouvrages écrits par des hétéroclites, fous littéraires, autodidactes, bizarres et autres, Manoir de Pron
1986: La Bibliothèque Bleue en Normandie (with a notice on ) : livres de colportage de Rouen et Caen du XVIIe au XIXe siècle, Manoir de Pron
1988: Les Poètes néo-latins en Europe du XIe au XXe siècle, Manoir de Pron
1988: Louise Michel : légendes et chants de gestes canaques, présentation édition 1900
1989: Les Fastes de Bacchus et de Comus, ou histoire du boire et du manger en Europe de l'Antiquité à nos jours, à travers les livres, Paris, Éditions Belfond, (1181 volumes described with bibliographical, historical, anecdotal information)
1992 Hécatongraphie, Manoir de Pron
1992: Une bibliothèque bachique : collection Kilian Fritsch, Loudmer
1993: Léon Cladel, le rural écarlate 1835–1892 : livres, correspondances et manuscrits ; notices by Pierre Saunier, Manoir de Pron
1996: Auguste Poulet-Malassis, un imprimeur sur le Parnasse : ses ancêtres, ses auteurs, ses amis, ses écrits, Montigny-sur-Canne, Manoir de Pron, et Imprimerie Alençonnaise
2000: Nil Rouge, Éditions Gallimard
2000: Pera Palas, Le Cherche-midi
2002: Palomas Canyon, Le Cherche-midi
2002: Bibliothèque bachique de M. Bernard Chwartz, Books and ancient and modern documents on wine, viticulture and oenology, Paris
2002: Salami, Actes Sud, (in collab. with Hans Gissinger)
2003: La vie est un tango, collection of his chronicles broadcast on France Musique from 2001 to 2003, Flammarion
2004: Retour à Zornhof, Grasset et Fasquelle, (Prix des Deux Magots)
2005: Passion-Livre, Gérard Oberlé : exposition médiathèque Jean-Jaurès - Nevers, 26 November 2005 – 14 January 2006.- Nevers : Bibliothèque Municipale de Nevers 
2006: Itinéraire spiritueux, Grasset et Fasquelle
2007: , collection of chronics broadcast on France Musique from 2003 to 2004, Éditions Grasset
2009: Mémoires de Marc-Antoine Muret, Grasset et Fasquelle
2012: Émilie, une aventure épistolaire, Grasset et Fasquelle
2016: Bonnes nouvelles de Chassignet, Grasset et Fasquelle, - Finalist of the Prix Alexandre-Vialatte)

 References 

 External links 
 Gérard Oberlé on Babelio
 Le manoir du savoir-livre de Gérard Oberlé on L'Express GERARD OBERLÉ PARCOURS ROMANESQUE on L'Humanité (5 June 1999)
 Itinéraire spiritueux by Gérard Oberlé on Cepdivin.org (11 July 2013)
 Oeuvre littéraire de Gérard Oberlé  on Librairie du Manoir de Pron
 "L'interview de Gérard Oberlé", Les Dernières Nouvelles d'Alsace'', 10 March 2012 : first and second parts

20th-century French non-fiction writers
21st-century French non-fiction writers
Prix des Deux Magots winners
French bibliographers
French bibliophiles
1945 births
People from Saverne
Living people